Soyuz TM-16 was the sixteenth expedition to the Russian Space Station Mir.

The Soyuz-TM crew transports (T - транспортный - Transportnyi - meaning transport, M - модифицированный - Modifitsirovannyi- meaning modified) were fourth generation (1986–2002) Soyuz spacecraft used for ferry flights to the Mir and ISS space stations. It added to the Soyuz-T new docking and rendezvous, radio communications, emergency and integrated parachute/landing engine systems. The new Kurs rendezvous and docking system permitted the Soyuz-TM to maneuver independently of the station, without the station making "mirror image" maneuvers to match unwanted translations introduced by earlier models' aft-mounted attitude control.

Crew

Mission highlights

16th expedition to Mir.

First Soyuz without a probe and drogue docking system since 1976. It carried
an APAS-89 androgynous docking unit different from the APAS-75 unit used for ASTP in 1975, yet similar in general principles. Soyuz-TM 16 used it to dock with an androgynous docking port on the Kristall module. This was a test of the docking system in preparation for dockings by the Space Shuttles with Mir.

References 

Crewed Soyuz missions
Spacecraft launched in 1993